The Spring Cup was a Scottish football tournament played in 1976. It was introduced for members of Division One and Two of the Scottish Football League in the wake of league reconstruction in 1975, to be played after the conclusion of all the league fixtures at the end of the 1975–76 season. It derived its title from the season (spring) it was played in.

League reconstruction and foundation
When Scottish Football League member clubs voted in favour reconstruction in the summer of 1974, the format they approved was a three division structure of 10, 14 and 14 teams respectively, to be introduced at the beginning of the 1975–76 season. The new Divisions One and Two would now contain 14 teams, previously considered a difficult number for creating a balanced schedule. A 26-game programme (with every team playing each other home and away) was considered too short, a 52-game programme (with each team playing each other home and away twice) too congested. A 39-game schedule would leave an imbalance with sides having two fixtures at home against some teams, and one against others. The solution the Scottish Football League opted for was a 26-game calendar augmented by a supplementary cup competition, the "Spring Cup". The tournament, to be played at the season's end, was open only to teams from Divisions One and Two.

Format
The 28 Division One and Two clubs were divided into seven groups of 4 teams. These sides would play each other home and away, with two points awarded for a win and one for a draw, the top two sides in the group qualifying for the second round. In addition, the two third-placed sides with the best record would also qualify. The second round and quarter-finals were played on a two-leg, home and away basis, while the semi-finals and final were to be played at neutral venues.

1975–76 Spring Cup
Division One Airdrieonians won the competition, defeating Division Two Clydebank in the final. They had qualified from a group containing Brechin City, East Fife and Stranraer. In the second round they eliminated Dunfermline Athletic 5–4 on aggregate, while in the quarter-finals they beat Hamilton Academical. In the semi-final, a strike from Cairney and two own goals helped them defeat Morton 3–1 at Love Street.

First round

Group 1

Group 2

Group 3

Group 4

Group 5

Group 6

Group 7

Second Rounds

First Leg

Second Leg

Quarter-finals

First Leg

Second Leg

Semi-finals

Final

Demise
It quickly became apparent that the competition was not proving popular with spectators, and club directors began to talk of further change. The Scottish Football League itself seemed to have an ambiguous attitude to the competition, failing to have the trophy engraved before the first final. In May 1976, a motion forwarded by Albion Rovers to have a 39-game Division One and Two calendar, effectively ending the Spring Cup, was overwhelmingly backed, coming into force for the start of the 1976–77 season.

See also
 Scottish C Division League Cup
 Scottish B Division Supplementary Cup
 Scottish Challenge Cup

References

External links
Competition details at scottishleague.net
"Can We Have Our Cup Back? at derek-drennan.co.uk
Spring Cup results at statto.com

Defunct football cup competitions in Scotland